Hochuli is a Swiss German surname. Notable people with the surname include:

 Ed Hochuli (born 1950), American attorney and football referee
 Jost Hochuli (born 1933), Swiss graphic designer
 Shawn Hochuli (born 1978), American football referee

See also
 Hochul (surname)

Swiss-German surnames